Sir Henry Ayers (now pron. "airs")  (1 May 1821 – 11 June 1897) was the eighth Premier of South Australia, serving a record five times between 1863 and 1873.

His lasting memorial is in the name Ayers Rock, also known as Uluru, which was encountered in 1873 by William Gosse.

Overview 

Ayers was born at Portsea, Portsmouth, Hampshire, England, the son of William Ayers, of the Portsmouth dockyard, and Elizabeth, née Breakes. Educated at the Beneficial Society's School (Portsea) he entered a law office in 1832. He emigrated, as a carpenter, to South Australia in 1840 with his wife, Anne (née Potts) with free passages. Until 1845 he worked as a law clerk, he was then appointed secretary of the South Australian Mining Association's Burra Burra mines. Henry Roach was chief Captain, responsible for day-to-day operations, from 1847 to 1867. Within a year the mine employed over 1000 men. For nearly 50 years, Ayers was in control of this mine, initially as the secretary and later as the managing director. He made his wealth from the Burra Burra Copper Mines, which was known as the "Monster Mine", which secured the wealth of the colony of South Australia.

Politics 

On 9 March 1857 Ayers was elected to the first South Australian Legislative Council under responsible government, the youngest member elected. He was continuously a member for over 36 years. For many years the whole colony formed a single electorate for the council; on two occasions (1865 and 1873) Ayers headed the poll.

In March 1863 Ayers was selected as one of the three South Australian representatives at the inter-colonial conference on uniform tariffs and inland customs duties. He also represented the colony at several other conferences from 1864 to 1877. 
On 4 July 1863 Ayers became minister without portfolio in the first Dutton cabinet. This ministry resigned just 11 days later however, as council demanded that it should have an executive minister to represent the government and Dutton refused. Ayers formed his first ministry as Premier and Chief Secretary on 15 July 1863. The house was much divided and it was almost impossible to get business done. Ayers reconstructed his ministry on 22 July 1864 but was defeated, and resigned on 4 August 1864. The Blyth ministry which was then formed included Ayers as chief secretary, but did not survive a general election and resigned on 22 March 1865. When Dutton formed his second ministry Ayers had his old position as chief secretary, and still retaining that office, formed his third administration on 20 September 1865 which lasted just over a month. In spite of dissolutions it was found very difficult to get a workable house. There were 18 ministries tween July 1863 and July 1873. Ayers became the premier again from May 1867 to September 1868, October to November 1868, 27 January 1872 to March 1872, and with an entirely new team of ministers, from March 1872 to July 1873. He held the position of chief secretary in the Colton ministry from June 1876 to October 1877, his last term of office.

In 1881 Ayers was elected President of the South Australian Legislative Council, and until December 1893 carried out his duties with ability, impartiality and courtesy. He died in Adelaide on 11 June 1897. His wife had died in 1881, and he was survived by three sons and a daughter. He was created a CMG in 1870, knighted a KCMG in 1872, and raised to GCMG in 1894.

Legacy 

Apart from his mining interests, Ayers held important directorates and was for many years a member and chairman of the board of trustees of the Savings Bank of South Australia; he was re-appointed chairman only a few days before his death. He was the first Chairman of the South Australian Gas Company, from 1862 was a governor of the Adelaide Botanic Gardens, president of the South Australian Old Colonists' Association, and was for many years on the council of the University of Adelaide. He was in parliament for an unbroken term of 37 years and in no other Australian colony or state has a politician exercised so much influence or been in so many ministries while a member of the upper house. It is likely, however, that if Ayers had been in the House of Assembly he would have had more control of business, and his seven premierships would have been longer in duration and more fruitful in results. An address he gave on Pioneer Difficulties on Founding South Australia was published as a pamphlet in 1891.

Ayers resided in Ayers House from 1855 until 1897 and built it from a 9-room house into a grand mansion in the 1860s. The youngest child, Lucy, was born at Ayers House. During Sir Henry's parliamentary service, Ayers House was used for Cabinet meetings, parliamentary dinners, and grand balls.

Family
Henry Ayers married Anne Potts (1812 – 13 August 1881) at Alverstoke around 1839. Anne was a sister of winemaker Frank Potts. They had four surviving sons and two daughters:
Frank Richman Ayers (1842 – 23 April 1906)
Henry "Harry" Lockett Ayers (1844–1905), married Ada Fisher Morphett (5 May 1843 – 1939) on 1 October 1866
Frederick "Fred" Ayers (1847 – 1 February 1897) married Evelyn Cameron Page on 8 November 1870. He was a prominent member of the South Australian Jockey Club.
Margaret Elizabeth Ayers (1848 – 19 September 1887) married Arthur Robert Lungley on 29 April 1875
Charles Coke Ayers (1850–1850)
(Arthur) Ernest Ayers (1852 – 2 April 1921) married Barbara Agnes Milne on 30 April 1878. Barbara was a daughter of William Milne MP.
Lucy Josephine Ayers (1856 – 11 May 1945) married John Bagot on 24 September 1878. John was a grandson of Charles Hervey Bagot.

References 
 
The Advertiser, Adelaide, 12 June 1897;
E. Hodder, The History of South Australia.

Additional sources listed by the Australian Dictionary of Biography:
L. L. Ayers, Sir Henry Ayers, K.C.M.G. and His Family (Adel, 1946);
G. D. Combe, Responsible Government in South Australia (Adel, 1957);
The South Australian Register, 12 June 1897;
P. L. Edgar, Sir James Boucaut (B.A. Hons thesis, University of Adelaide, 1961);
J. B. Graham letters (National Library of Australia);
Henry Parkes letters (State Library of New South Wales).

External links
SA Parliament – Ayers
Daguerreotype of Sir Henry Ayers, c.1848, State Library of South Australia

|-

|-

|-

|-

|-

|-

|-

|-

|-

|-

|-

Premiers of South Australia
1821 births
1897 deaths
Knights Grand Cross of the Order of St Michael and St George
Australian politicians awarded knighthoods
English emigrants to colonial Australia
Presidents of the South Australian Legislative Council
Settlers of South Australia
Adelaide Club
19th-century Australian businesspeople
19th-century Australian politicians
People from Portsea, Portsmouth
South Australian politicians